An electric toothbrush is a toothbrush that makes rapid automatic bristle motions, either back-and-forth oscillation or rotation-oscillation (where the brush head alternates clockwise and counterclockwise rotation), in order to clean teeth.  Motions at sonic speeds or below are made by a motor.  In the case of ultrasonic toothbrushes, ultrasonic motions are produced by a piezoelectric crystal. A modern electric toothbrush is usually powered by a rechargeable battery charged through inductive charging when the brush sits in the charging base between uses.

Electric toothbrushes can be classified according to the frequency (speed) of their movements as power, sonic or ultrasonic toothbrushes, depending on whether they make movements that are below, in or above the audible range (20–20,000 Hz or 2400–2,400,000 movements per minute), respectively.

History 

The earliest example of an electric toothbrush was first produced by Tomlinson Moseley. Sold as the Motodent, a patent was filed by his company, Motodent Inc. on December 13, 1937. In Switzerland in 1954 Dr. Philippe Guy Woog invented the Broxodent. Woog's electric toothbrushes were originally manufactured in Switzerland (later in France) for Broxo S.A. The device plugged into a standard wall outlet and ran on line voltage. Electric toothbrushes were initially created for patients with limited motor skills and for orthodontic patients (such as those with braces).

The Broxo Electric Toothbrush was introduced in the US by E. R. Squibb and Sons Pharmaceuticals in 1960. After introduction, it was marketed in the US by Squibb under the names Broxo-Dent or Broxodent. In the 1980s Squibb transferred distribution of the Broxodent line to the Somerset Labs division of Bristol-Myers Squibb.

The General Electric automatic toothbrush was introduced in the early 1960s; it was cordless, with rechargeable NiCad batteries and although portable, was rather bulky, about the size of a two-D-cell flashlight handle. NiCad batteries of this period suffered from the memory effect. The GE automatic toothbrush came with a charging stand that held the hand piece upright; most units were kept in the charger, which is not the best way to get maximum service life from a NiCad battery. Also, early NiCad batteries tended to have a short lifespan. The batteries were sealed inside the GE device, and the whole unit had to be discarded when the batteries failed.

The use of an AC line voltage appliance in a bathroom environment was problematic. By the early 1990s Underwriter Laboratories (UL) and Canadian Standards Association (CSA) no longer certified line-voltage appliances for bathroom use. Newer appliances had to use a step-down transformer to operate at low voltage (typically 12, 16 or 24 volts). Wiring standards in many countries require that outlets in bath areas must be protected by a RCD/GFCI device (e.g., required in the US since the 1970s on bathroom outlets in new construction).

By the 1990s there were problems with safety certification of Broxo's original design. Further, improved battery-operated toothbrushes were providing formidable competition.

The first ultrasonic toothbrush, first called the Ultima and later the Ultrasonex, was patented in the US in 1992, the same year the FDA gave it approval for daily home use. Initially, the Ultima worked only on ultrasound, but a few years later, a motor was added to give the Ultrasonex brush additional sonic vibration. Today, several ultrasonic toothbrushes simultaneously provide both ultrasound and sonic vibration. In more modern times, electric toothbrushes have been used as a substitute for vibrators for those who wish to avoid embarrassment.

The negative environmental impact of electric toothbrushes when compared with manual toothbrushes has been established.

Types 

Electric toothbrushes can be classified according to their type of action:

 Side to side vibration, which has a brush head action that moves laterally from side to side.
 Counter oscillation, which has a brush action in which adjacent tufts of bristles (usually six to 10 in number) rotate in one direction and then the other, independently, with each tuft rotating in the opposite direction to that adjacent to it.
 Rotation oscillation, which has a brush action in which the brush head rotates in one direction and then the other.
 Circular, which has a brush action in which the brush head rotates in one direction only.
 Ultrasonic, which has a brush action where the bristles vibrate at ultrasonic frequencies (> 20 kHz).
 Ionic, which has a brush that aims to impart an electrical charge to the tooth surface with the intent of disrupting the attachment of dental plaque.

For some vibrating toothbrush designs, a brushing technique similar to that used with a manual toothbrush is recommended, whereas with brushes with a spinning head the recommended cleaning technique is to simply move the brush slowly from tooth to tooth.

Electric toothbrushes can also be classified according to the speed of their movements as standard power toothbrushes, sonic toothbrushes or ultrasonic toothbrushes.  If the motion of the toothbrush is sufficiently rapid to produce a hum in the audible frequency of human range (20 Hz to 20,000 Hz), it can be classified as a sonic toothbrush.  Any electric toothbrush with movement faster than this limit can be classified as an ultrasonic toothbrush. Certain ultrasonic toothbrushes, such as the Megasonex and the Ultreo, have both sonic and ultrasonic movements.

Oscillating rotating 

The oscillating rotating toothbrush is a type of electric toothbrush which was introduced by Oral-B in the 1990s. This type of toothbrush is not shaped like a conventional manual toothbrush. Instead, it is made of a small round brush head that oscillates and rotates to remove plaque. The shape of the brush head is very similar to the prophylaxis hand piece used by dental professionals to remove plaque in the dental office. This design enables the bristles to reach further into the hard-to-reach areas between the teeth to remove plaque. Some versions of the oscillating rotating toothbrush also involve a pulsating motion which enables a more three dimensional clean.

The Oral-B iO toothbrush has a linear magnetic drive system. This system allows the concentration of energy to be at the tip of the brush bristles while using the oscillating rotating motion. The brush also allows for 3D tracking using artificial intelligence that connects the toothbrush with an app. This technology enables to the user to have instant feedback on their brushing efficacy and can track the data if the user wishes to bring the information to their dental professional for more personalized oral health instruction and education. Furthermore, the Oral-B iO toothbrush also has a smart pressure sensor which is electronically calibrated to let the user know if they are brushing with too much pressure, or not enough, and automatically adapts the oscillation speed to protect the teeth and gums when excess pressure is applied.

The safety of oscillating rotating toothbrushes has also been studied. Oscillating rotating toothbrushes are proven to be safe as compared to manual toothbrushes and are safe for both the hard and soft tissues of the oral cavity.

Sonic 

Sonic toothbrushes are a subset of electric toothbrushes with movement that is fast enough to produce vibration in the audible range.  Most modern rechargeable electric toothbrushes from brands such as Sonicare, FOREO, and Oral-B fall into this category and typically have frequencies that range from 200 to 400 Hz, that is 12,000–24,000 oscillations or 24,000–48,000 movements per minute. Because sonic toothbrushes rely on sweeping motion alone to clean the teeth, the movement that they provide is often high in amplitude, meaning that the length of the sweeping movements that they make is large. One study found that using sonic toothbrush causes less abrasion to the gum when compared to the manual toothbrush.

Ultrasonic 

The newest developments in this field are ultrasonic toothbrushes, which use ultrasonic waves to clean the teeth. In order for a toothbrush to be considered "ultrasonic" it has to emit a wave at a minimum frequency of 20,000 Hz or 2.4 million movements per minute. Typically, ultrasonic toothbrushes approved by the U.S. Food and Drug Administration (FDA) operate at a frequency of 1.6 MHz, which translates to 192 million movements per minute.

Ultrasonic toothbrushes emit vibrations that are very high in frequency but low in amplitude. These vibrations break up bacterial chains that make up dental plaque and remove their methods of attachment to the tooth surface up to 5 mm below the gum line.

Some ultrasonic toothbrushes, such as the Emmi-Dent, provide only ultrasonic motion.  Other ultrasonic toothbrushes, such as the Ultreo and the Megasonex, provide additional sonic vibration ranging from 9,000 to 40,000 movements per minute, comparable to a sonic toothbrush, in order to provide additional sweeping motion which facilitates removal of food particles and bacterial chain remnants.  The sonic vibration in these ultrasonic toothbrushes may be lower in amplitude than that found in a comparable sonic toothbrush because the bacterial chains do not need to be removed through sonic vibration, simply swept away, as they have already been broken up by the ultrasound.

Because of the similarity of the terms "ultrasonic" and "sonic", there is some confusion in the marketplace and sonic toothbrushes are frequently mislabeled as ultrasonic ones. A toothbrush operating at a frequency or vibration of less than 20,000 Hz is a "sonic" toothbrush. It is called "sonic" because its operating frequency, for example 31,000 movements per minute, is within the human hearing range of between roughly 20 Hz to about 20,000 Hz.  Only a toothbrush that emits ultrasound, or vibration at a frequency greater than the upper limit of human hearing, can be called an "ultrasonic" toothbrush.

Effectiveness 
In 2014, a Cochrane review demonstrated that power toothbrushes remove more plaque and reduce gingival inflammation more than manual toothbrushes. This review showed electric toothbrushes had greater effectiveness over manual ones. For example, plaque build-up and gingival inflammation were reduced by 11% and 6% respectively after one to three months of use.  After three months of use, the reduction observed was even greater – 21% reduction in plaque and 11% reduction in gingival inflammation.  Although the scale of these differences in a clinical setting remains questionable, other reviews have reached similar conclusions. Another large review of studies also concluded that power toothbrushes were more effective in removing plaque than manual brushes for children. For patients with limited manual dexterity or where difficulty exists in reaching rear teeth, electric toothbrushes may be especially beneficial.

With regards to the effectiveness of different electric toothbrushes, the oscillation rotation models have been found to remove more plaque than manual toothbrushes. More specific studies have also been conducted demonstrating oscillating rotating toothbrush effectiveness to be superior to manual toothbrushes for patients undergoing orthodontic treatment. Notably, only the oscillating rotating power toothbrush was able to consistently provide statistically significant benefit over manual toothbrushes in the 2014 Cochrane Review.  This suggests that oscillating rotating power toothbrushes may be more effective than other electric toothbrushes. More recent evidence also supports this as new studies suggest that oscillating rotating toothbrushes are more effective than high frequency sonic power toothbrushes. Overall, oscillating rotating toothbrushes are effective in reducing gingival inflammation and plaque.

Other factors that influence effectiveness amongst electric toothbrushes involve factors such as the amount of time spent brushing and the condition of the brush head. Manufacturers recommend that heads be changed every three months or as soon as the brush head has visibly deteriorated.

Power source and charging 
Modern electric toothbrushes run on low voltage, 12 V or less. A few units use a step-down transformer to power the brush, but most use a battery, usually but not always rechargeable and non-replaceable, fitted inside the handle, which is hermetically sealed to prevent water damage. While early NiCd battery toothbrushes used metal tabs to connect with the charging base, some toothbrushes use inductive charging.

Environmental concerns 
According to Friends of the Earth, "Disposable electric toothbrushes are one example of a terrible product ... it's virtually impossible to separate out the tech from the batteries and plastic casing which means valuable and often toxic materials are dumped in landfill or burnt in incinerators." A study published in British Dental Journal found climate change potential of the electric toothbrush was 11 times greater than the bamboo toothbrush. The bamboo toothbrush was, however, not the most environmentally sustainable toothbrush, contrary to popular belief because using them just stops land from being put to better use such as helping biodiversity, or in growing forests to offset carbon emissions. A plastic manual replaceable head toothbrush was probably the best, according to the study.

Optional features

Timer 
Many modern electric toothbrushes have a timer that buzzes, or briefly interrupts power, typically after two minutes, and sometimes every 30 seconds. This is associated with a customary recommendation to brush for two minutes, 30 seconds for each of the four quadrants of the mouth.

Display 
Some electric toothbrushes have LCD screens that show brushing time and sometimes smiley face icons or other images to encourage optimal brushing. These features could encourage people to brush more accurately.

Pressure sensor 
Brushing teeth too hard causes enamel and gum damage. Most modern top-end sonic toothbrushes come with a pressure sensor, which prevents users from brushing too aggressively. There are two types of pressure sensors. Some sensors produce a sound warning and some immediately stop movements of the sonic toothbrush when it is used too aggressively. Some electric brushes, such as the Oral B oscillating rotating brush, simultaneously coach the user to brush with optimal pressure during the brushing experience itself using AI and Bluetooth technology.

Ultrasound indicator 
Because ultrasonic frequencies are beyond the audible range and the amplitude of movement emitted by an ultrasonic toothbrush is typically too small to be perceived, the ultrasound is imperceptible to humans and it may not be apparent that a brush running if pure ultrasound is turned on. Ultrasonic toothbrushes may include an indicator to notify the user that ultrasound is being emitted.

Bluetooth 

Bluetooth connectivity enables data to be transmitted from an electric toothbrush to another Bluetooth device, such as a smartphone. The brush can send data to a mobile app such as how long it has been brushing for and if too much pressure has been applied when brushing. The app can in turn send data back to the brush such as changing the cleaning modes available, and cleaning time. The sharing of data between toothbrush and smartphone is intended to assist the user in creating better brushing technique and habits. This technology enables coaching for the user as it tracks where the user brushes, how long in each area, and consequently, can identify areas where the user commonly misses. 
Electric toothbrush models that currently utilise Bluetooth include the Oral-B Pro 6000, Pro 6500, Pro 7000 and Genius 9000, Oral-B iO as well as Phillips Sonicare Diamond Clean Smart.

Cleaning modes 
Most sonic toothbrushes come with different cleaning modes and intensity levels. Cleaning modes are designed for special types of cleaning efficiency. Some of the most well known are Sensitive, Daily care, Whitening and Tongue cleaning.

Certain toothbrushes that offer both ultrasonic and sonic motion allow for the intensity of the sonic motion to be reduced, or even for the sonic motion to be turned off entirely so that only ultrasound is emitted.  Since ultrasound movements are very low in amplitude, this setting may be indicated for patients who may not be suitable candidates for typical sonic or power toothbrush vibration but need the additional cleaning power of an ultrasonic toothbrush, such as patients who have recently undergone periodontal surgery.

References 

Dental equipment
American inventions
20th-century inventions